Goomtee Tea Estate  is a tea garden in the Kurseong CD block in the Kurseong subdivision of the Darjeeling district in the Indian state of West Bengal.

History
Goomtee Tea Estate was planted by Henry Montgomery Lennox in 1899. It was subsequently managed by G.W.O’Brien, who was forced in the aftermath of the Second World War to sell it to the ruling Rana of Nepal. In the mid-1950s it was taken over by co-owners: the Kejriwal family and Mahabir Prasad.

Geography

Location
It is on National Highway 110 linking Siliguri with Darjeeling.
 
Other tea estates in the area are: Jungpana, Sivitar and Giddapahar. 

Note: The map alongside presents some of the notable locations in the subdivision. All places marked in the map are linked in the larger full screen map.

Economy
Goomtee Tea Garden produces amongst finest qualities of Darjeeling tea. It employs 300 garden workers.

Tourism
More than a century-old heritage bungalow of the British planters has been renovated and thrown open to tourists.

References

Liptouchfoods tea Estate Liptocuhfoods Retrieved 20 March 2020

External links
 

Tea estates in Darjeeling district